Ultrasound Quarterly is a quarterly peer-reviewed medical journal covering research on medical ultrasound. It was established in 1988 and is published by Lippincott Williams & Wilkins on behalf of the Society of Radiologists in Ultrasound, of which it is the official journal. The editor-in-chief is Theodore J. Dubinsky. According to the Journal Citation Reports, the journal has a 2017 impact factor of 1.021, ranking it 108th out of 126 journals in the category "Radiology, Nuclear Medicine, and Medical Imaging".

References

External links

Radiology and medical imaging journals
Quarterly journals
Lippincott Williams & Wilkins academic journals
English-language journals
Publications established in 1988